FC Dnepr Smolensk is an association football club from Smolensk, Russia, founded in 2004 and dissolved in 2019. Another Smolensk team, FC Kristall Smolensk, was dissolved in early 2004. It played in the Russian Professional Football League from 2005 to 2007 and then again from 2009 to 2019.

Club name history
 2004–2008: FC Smolensk
 2008–2016: FC Dnepr Smolensk
 2016–2018: SFC CRFSO Smolensk SFC stands for "Sport-Football Club" and CRFSO stands for "Center of Football Development of Smolensk Oblast".
 2018–2019 : FC Dnepr Smolensk

On 26 March 2019, the PFL announced that the club dropped out of competition voluntarily, due to lack of financing.

On 22 March 2022 announced the revival of the club.

References

External links
Official website

Association football clubs established in 2004
Association football clubs disestablished in 2019
Defunct football clubs in Russia
Sport in Smolensk
2004 establishments in Russia
2019 disestablishments in Russia